Charles Cochrane may refer to:

 Charles Cochrane (engineer) (1835–1898), British engineer
 Charles Cochrane (social reformer) (1807–1855), British social reformer
 Charles Cochrane-Baillie, 2nd Baron Lamington (1860–1940), British politician and colonial governor
 Charles H. Cochrane (1943–2008), first openly gay New York City policeman
 Charles Norris Cochrane (1889–1945), Canadian historian and philosopher